Gasoline Alley is a 1951 American comedy film directed by Edward Bernds and starring Scotty Beckett, Jimmy Lydon and Susan Morrow. It is based on the cartoon of the same name by Frank King. It was followed the same year by a sequel, Corky of Gasoline Alley.

Plot
The popular Frank O. King comic strip characters go from newspaper page to screen in this 1951 feature film from legendary comedy director Edward Bernds (of Three Stooges and Bowery Boys fame). Scotty Beckett and Jimmy Lydon are Corky and Skeezix, half-brothers who find themselves in the restaurant business until complications and some family conflicts arise.

Cast
 Scotty Beckett as Corky 
 Jimmy Lydon as Skeezix 
 Susan Morrow as Hope 
 Don Beddoe as Walt Wallet 
 Patti Brady as Judy 
 Madelon Baker as Phyllis / Auntie Blossom 
 Dick Wessel as Pudge 
 Gus Schilling as Joe Allen 
 Kay Christopher as Nina 
 Byron Foulger as Charles D. Haven 
 Virginia Toland as Carol Rice 
 Jimmy Lloyd as Harry Dorsey 
 William Forrest as Hacker 
 Ralph Peters as Reddick 
 Charles Halton as Pettit 
 Charles Williams as Mortie 
 Christine McIntyre as Myrtle

References

Bibliography
 Bernard F. Dick. Columbia Pictures: Portrait of a Studio. University Press of Kentucky, 2015.

External links
 

1951 films
1951 comedy films
American comedy films
Films directed by Edward Bernds
Columbia Pictures films
American black-and-white films
1950s English-language films
1950s American films